Uruguay competed at the 1952 Summer Olympics in Helsinki, Finland. 32 competitors, 31 men and 1 woman, took part in 17 events in 9 sports.

Medalists

Bronze
 Sergio Matto, Wilfredo Pelaez, Carlos Roselló, Tabaré Larre, Adesio Lombardo, Roberto Lovera, Héctor Costa, Nelson Demarco, Héctor Garcia, Martín Acosta y Lara, Enrique Baliño, and Victorio Cieslinskas — Basketball, Men's Team Competition
 Juan Rodríguez and Miguel Seijas — Rowing, Men's Double Sculls

Athletics

Hércules Ascune
Estrella Puente

Basketball

Men's team competition
Main Round (Group A)
 Defeated Czechoslovakia (53-51)
 Defeated Hungary (70-56)
 Lost to United States (44-57)
Final Round (Group A)
 Lost to France (56-58)
 Defeated Bulgaria (62-54)
 Defeated Argentina (66-65)
Semifinals
 Lost to Soviet Union (57-61)
Bronze Medal Match
 Defeated Argentina (68-59) →  Bronze Medal
Team roster
Martín Acosta y Lara
Enrique Baliño
Victorio Cieslinskas
Héctor Costa
Nelson Demarco
Héctor García
Tabaré Larre Borges
Adesio Lombardo
Roberto Lovera
Sergio Matto
Wilfredo Peláez
Carlos Rosello
Head coach: Olguiz Rodríguez

Boxing

Luis Albino Acuña
Luis Sosa

Cycling

Road Competition
Men's Individual Road Race (190.4 km)
Virgilio Pereyra — 5:22:33.4 (→ 33rd place)
Luis Angel de los Santos — 5:22:34.4 (→ 38th place)
Mario Machado — 5:23:33.7 (→ 39th place)
Julio Sobrera — did not finish (→ no ranking)

Track Competition
Men's 1.000m Time Trial
Luis Angel de los Santos
 Final — 1:17.0 (→ 19th place)

Juan de Armas
Atilio Francois
Luis Pedro Serra

Fencing

Two fencers, both men, represented Uruguay in 1952.

Men's foil
Sergio Iesi
Ricardo Rimini

Modern pentathlon

Three male pentathletes represented Uruguay in 1952.

Individual
 Américo González
 Alberto Ortíz
 Lem Martínez

Team
 Alberto Ortíz
 Lem Martínez
 Américo González

Rowing

Uruguay had three male rowers participate in two out of seven rowing events in 1952.

 Men's single sculls
 Eduardo Risso

 Men's double sculls
 Miguel Seijas
 Juan Rodríguez

Sailing

Eugenio Lauz Santurio

Swimming

Eduardo Priggione

References

External links
Montevideo.com
Official Olympic Reports
International Olympic Committee results database

Nations at the 1952 Summer Olympics
1952
1952 in Uruguayan sport